LAGLIDADG RNA motifs are conserved RNA structures that were discovered by bioinformatics.
These RNA motifs are associated with genes that encode endonucleases of the LAGLIDADG variety.  Although group I introns are often present in self-replicating elements that use LAGLIDADG endonucleases, the known LAGLIDADG RNA motifs appear too small and structurally simple to function as a self-splicing intron.

A LAGLIDADG-1 motif RNA is predicted in the fungus Trametes cingulata as well as many metagenomic sequences, which presumably are derived from other fungi. LAGLIDADG-2 motif RNAs are found in Halobacteria.
It is ambiguous whether LAGLIDADG-1 RNAs function as cis-regulatory elements or whether they operate in trans.

References

Non-coding RNA